The U.S. Animal Quarantine Station is located in Clifton, Passaic County, New Jersey, United States. The buildings were built in 1900. The facility, considered the Ellis Island for Animals, closed in 1975. 

The complex was added to the National Register of Historic Places on October 9, 1981. 

Part of the site is now the Clifton Municipal Complex. Two of the buildings were renovated and turned into the Clifton Arts Center Gallery and Studio. An atrium was built to connect the two buildings.

It is considered to be threatened site.

See also 
 National Register of Historic Places listings in Passaic County, New Jersey

References

Clifton, New Jersey
Buildings and structures in Passaic County, New Jersey
National Register of Historic Places in Passaic County, New Jersey
New Jersey Register of Historic Places
Ellis Island